Magnolia Manor is a postbellum manor located in Cairo, Illinois, located in Alexander County. It has been listed on the National Register of Historic Places since December 17, 1969.

The house is operated as a Victorian period historic house museum by the Cairo Historical Association.

History
The manor was built by the Cairo businessman Charles A. Galigher in 1869. It is a 14-room red brick house which features double walls intended to keep out the city's famous dampness with their ten-inch airspaces. Inside the home are many original, 19th-century furnishings. Galigher became a friend of Ulysses S. Grant during the time Grant had command in Cairo. When Grant retired after two terms as president he was subject of a lavish celebration at Magnolia Manor.

Notes

External links
Visitor's Guide to Magnolia Manor - part of a guide to the mid-Mississippi Valley
Unofficial Southern Illinois Website - Magnolia Manor page
Library of Congress - Survey number HABS IL-218 (Listed in 1934 as Peter T. Langan House the owner at the time)

Houses on the National Register of Historic Places in Illinois
Cairo, Illinois
Houses in Alexander County, Illinois
Museums in Alexander County, Illinois
Historic house museums in Illinois
National Register of Historic Places in Alexander County, Illinois
Houses completed in 1869
1869 establishments in Illinois